"Kill Me" is a song by American rock band the Pretty Reckless, released as a single on December 7, 2012, by Interscope Records. The song was initially intended to serve as the lead single from the band's then-untitled second studio album, as announced by lead singer Taylor Momsen through her Twitter account. However, after the Pretty Reckless moved record labels from Interscope to Razor & Tie, "Kill Me" was left out of the band's second album, Going to Hell (2014), although it was included as a bonus track on the Japanese edition of the album.

On December 17, 2012, the track was featured at the end of the final episode of the television series Gossip Girl, where Momsen made a guest appearance as her character Jenny Humphrey, having previously left the show in May 2011.

Track listing
Digital download
"Kill Me" – 3:47

Charts

Release history

References

2012 singles
2012 songs
Interscope Records singles
The Pretty Reckless songs
Songs written by Kato Khandwala
Songs written by Taylor Momsen